Kriva Reka or Kriva Rijeka (Serbo-Croatian for "Curved River"), or Kriva River may refer to:

Places
 Kriva Reka (Brus), a village in Brus, Serbia
 Kriva Reka (Gornji Milanovac), a village in Gornji Milanovac, Serbia
 Kriva Reka (Čajetina), a village in Čajetina, Serbia
 Kriva Rijeka (Dubica), a village in Dubica, Republika Srpska, Bosnia and Herzegovina

Rivers
 , a river in Bosnia and Herzegovina
 Kriva River (Pčinja), a tributary of the Pčinja River in the Republic of Macedonia

See also
 Krivá, a village and municipality in Slovakia, in Dolný Kubín District
 Krivaja (Bosna), a river in Bosnia and Herzegovina
 Reka (disambiguation)